The "War over Water", also  the Battle over Water, refers to a series of confrontations between Israel and its Arab neighbors from November 1964 to May 1967 over control of  water sources in the Jordan River drainage basin.

History

Early tensions: 1949–64

Following the 1948 Arab–Israeli War, the 1949 Armistice Agreements created three demilitarized zones on the Israel-Syria border. The southernmost, and also the largest, stretched from the south-eastern part of the Sea of Galilee eastwards to the Yarmuk River where the borders of Israel, Jordan and Syria converge. The issue of water sharing from the Jordan–Yarmuk system turned out to be a major problem between Israel, Syria and Jordan.

Small scale water-related skirmishes had occurred following the 1949 agreements. In July 1953, Israel began construction of an intake for its National Water Carrier at the Daughters of Jacob Jordan Bridge in the demilitarized zone north of the Sea of Galilee. Syrian artillery units opened fire on the construction site.  The United Nations security council majority (excepting the USSR) voted for the resumption of work by Israel. The Israelis then moved the intake to an economically inferior site at the Sea of Galilee.

In 1955 the Jordan Valley Unified Water Plan (Johnston Plan) was accepted by the technical committees of both Israel and the Arab League, but the Arab League Council decided not to ratify the plan on 11 October 1955. According to most observers, including Johnston himself, the Arab non-adoption of the plan was not total rejection. While they failed to approve it politically, they nevertheless seemed determined to adhere to the technical details of the agreement. Moreover, it continued to be taken seriously by Arab leaders. Though the Unified Plan failed to be ratified, both Jordan and Israel undertook to operate within their allocation limits.

Main phase: 1964–67
Israel completed its National Water Carrier project, which siphoned water from the Sea of Galilee in 1964. The initial diversion capacity of the National Water Carrier, without supplementary booster pumps, was 320 million m3, well within the limits of the Johnston Plan. 
Nevertheless, the Arab states were not prepared to coexist with a project which seemed likely to make a major contribution to Israel's economic growth. In January 1964 an Arab League summit meeting convened in Cairo and decided:
 The establishment of Israel is the basic threat that the Arab nation in its entirety has agreed to forestall. And since the existence of Israel is a danger that threatens the Arab nation, the diversion of the Jordan waters by it multiplies the dangers to Arab existence. Accordingly, the Arab states have to prepare the plans necessary for dealing with the political, economic and social aspects, so that if necessary results are not achieved, collective Arab military preparations, when they are not completed, will constitute the ultimate practical means for the final liquidation of Israel. 

The Arab states decided to deprive Israel of 35% of the National Water Carrier capacity, by a diversion of the Jordan River headwaters (both the Hasbani and the Banias) to the Yarmouk River. The scheme was only marginally feasible, as it was technically difficult and expensive.

A major escalation took place in 1964 when Israel declared it would regard the Diversion Project as an infringement on its sovereign rights.

In 1965, there were three notable border clashes, starting with Syrian shootings of Israeli farmers and army patrols, followed by Israeli tanks and artillery destroying the Arab heavy earth moving machines that were used for the diversion plan. The Arab countries eventually abandoned their project. Control of water resources and Israeli military attacks against the diversion effort are considered among the factors which led to the Six-Day War in June 1967.

The war is referenced in the famous US antiwar 1965 song "Eve of Destruction" by Barry McGuire with the line "And even the Jordan River has bodies floatin'".

See also
Headwater Diversion Plan (Jordan River)
Water politics in the Middle East

Notes

Further reading

 
 
 
 
 
 

Conflicts in 1964
Conflicts in 1965
Conflicts in 1966
Conflicts in 1967
Israel–Syria military relations
Water conflicts
Arab–Israeli conflict
Water in Syria
Water in Israel
Golan Heights